Pre-mRNA-processing factor 17 is a protein that in humans is encoded by the CDC40 gene.

Pre-mRNA splicing occurs in two sequential transesterification steps. The protein encoded by this gene is found to be essential for the catalytic step II in pre-mRNA splicing process. It is found in the spliceosome, and contains seven WD repeats, which function in protein-protein interactions. This protein has a sequence similarity to yeast Prp17 protein, which functions in two different cellular processes: pre-mRNA splicing and cell cycle progression. It suggests that this protein may play a role in cell cycle progression.

References

External links

Further reading